Galway East is a parliamentary constituency represented in Dáil Éireann, the lower house of the Irish parliament or Oireachtas. The constituency elects 3 deputies (Teachtaí Dála, commonly known as TDs) on the system of proportional representation by means of the single transferable vote (PR-STV).

History and boundaries
The constituency was first used at the 1937 general election, under the Electoral (Revision of Constituencies) Act 1935, when the former Galway constituency was split into Galway East and Galway West. It was abolished in 1948 and recreated in 1961. It was abolished again in 1969 and recreated in 1977.

It spans much of the eastern half of County Galway, taking in the towns of Tuam, Portumna, Athenry and Loughrea among other areas.

The Electoral (Amendment) (Dáil Constituencies) Act 2017 defines the constituency as:

TDs

TDs 1937–1948

TDs 1961–1969

TDs since 1977

Elections

2020 general election

2016 general election

2011 general election

2007 general election

2002 general election

1997 general election

1992 general election

1989 general election

1987 general election

November 1982 general election

July 1982 by-election
Following the death of Fianna Fáil TD Johnny Callanan, a by-election was held on 20 July 1982. The seat was won by the Fianna Fáil candidate Noel Treacy.

February 1982 general election

1981 general election

1977 general election

1965 general election

1964 by-election

1961 general election

1944 general election
Michael Gallagher notes the motive of the returning officer to conduct a second count was presumably to enable Stankard to keep his deposit.

1943 general election

1938 general election

1937 general election

See also
Elections in the Republic of Ireland
Politics of the Republic of Ireland
List of Dáil by-elections
List of political parties in the Republic of Ireland

References

External links
 Oireachtas Constituency Dashboards
 Oireachtas Members Database

Dáil constituencies
Politics of County Galway
1937 establishments in Ireland
1948 disestablishments in Ireland
Constituencies established in 1937
Constituencies disestablished in 1948
1961 establishments in Ireland
1969 disestablishments in Ireland
Constituencies established in 1961
Constituencies disestablished in 1969
1977 establishments in Ireland
Constituencies established in 1977